Jodocus (from Breton Iodoc, Latin Judocus), sometimes Josse, Joos, Joost, Joest, Jost, or Jobst is a given name and a family name. Other names such as Jocelyn, Jocelyne, Josselin, Josseline, or also Josquin and Jospin derived from it.

The given name Jodocus or its form Josse was popular in the Middle Ages in England.

People 
 Saint Judoc
 Jobst of Moravia
 Jodocus Badius
 Jodocus Hondius
 Joos de Damhouder

Fiction 
 Alfred Jodocus Kwak, a Dutch animated television series

Places 
 Josse, municipality in Landes, France
 Jost Van Dyke one of the British Virgin Islands
 Saint-Josse also called Saint-Josse-sur-Mer, municipality in Pas-de-Calais, France
 Saint-Josse-ten-Noode in French, Sint-Joost-ten-Node in Dutch, municipality in the Brussels-Capital Region, Belgium.
 Sint Joost, small village in Limburg, the Netherlands

See also 

Jösse Hundred - a district of Värmland in Sweden
Jösse Car - sports car producer located in Värmland

Given names
Surnames